The Eritrean Uprising was massive Student protests in Asmara, Eritrea in November 2017 against the government and bad living conditions and severe working life. Anti-government protests escalated on 1 November, when police clashed with protesters and fired Live ammunition to disperse protesters. On 2 November, groups of protesters rallied in downtown Asmara, using Placards and Slogans against the government and demanded better conditions and the resignation of the government. On 3 November, rallies and small-scale dissent was heard throughout the city as protesters rallied in a university against the government’s reign. Tear gas was seen being fired on 5-7 November, while demonstrators were adamant. Police opened fire on demonstrators almost daily, killing 28 protesters in Rallies.

See also
 2016 Ethiopian protests

References

2017 in Eritrea
2017 protests